The Joseph Smith House is a historic house at 109 Smithfield Road in North Providence, Rhode Island, United States.  It is a 2½-story wood-frame house, six bays wide, with a shed-style addition to the rear giving it a saltbox appearance.  The oldest portion of this house, built around 1705, is a classical Rhode Island stone-ender house, whose large chimney has since been completely enclosed in the structure.  The lower levels of this chimney are believed to predate King Philip's War (1675–76), when the previous house was burned.  The 1705 house was built by Joseph Smith, grandson of John Smith, the miller, one of Rhode Island's first settlers.  It was greatly enlarged in 1762 by Daniel Jenckes, a judge from a prominent Rhode Island family, for his son, and was for many years in the hands of Jenckes' descendants.  The house is the only known surviving stone-ender in North Providence.

The house was listed on the National Register of Historic Places in 1978.

See also
National Register of Historic Places listings in Providence County, Rhode Island
Stone-ender

References

External links

Joseph Smith House, 109 Cushing Street, North Providence, Providence, RI at the Historic American Buildings Survey (HABS)

Houses completed in 1705
Houses on the National Register of Historic Places in Rhode Island
Houses in Providence County, Rhode Island
Historic American Buildings Survey in Rhode Island
Buildings and structures in North Providence, Rhode Island
1705 establishments in Rhode Island
National Register of Historic Places in Providence County, Rhode Island